Cooks or Cook's Station, elevation , is a roadside stop on State Route 88 in Amador County in the Sierra Nevada mountains.

Built in 1863 as part of the Volcano cutoff of the Carson Emigrant Trail, Cooks Station is one of two remaining "stations" on the highway among many that sprang up after the road was completed over the Carson Pass in the 1860s.

Both stations are routinely used by the California Department of Transportation (CALTRANS) to indicate points where snow chains are required for continued travel during snowstorms. Current conditions and requirements are posted at the CALTRANS road information website.

References

External links 
 Cooks station history 

Buildings and structures in Amador County, California
California Trail
Stagecoach stations in California
1863 establishments in California
Transportation in Amador County, California